Radensko polje may refer to multiple places in Slovenia: 

Račna Karst Field (Slovene: Radensko polje), a karst field near Grosuplje
Radenci Basin (Slovene: Radensko polje), a floodplain near Radenci